George Washington Bleecker (January 1, 1800 – November 23, 1859) was an American teacher and politician from New York.

Life 
Bleecker was born in New York City on January 1, 1800. His father, Leonard Bleecker was an American Revolutionary War veteran, a New York assemblyman, and a personal friend and correspondant of George Washington. He was a direct descendant of Jan Jansen Bleecker. He served as second Lieutenant under Gen. Montgomery for the Invasion of Quebec (1775), and as Major general under Gen. John Sullivan. He then served as Major general under the Marquis de Lafayette, and witnessed with him the surrender of British General Cornwallis at the Siege of Yorktown.

Leonard's granddaughter, Fannie Amelia Bleecker, married Frank Willey Yale (b. 1854), a relative of Yale Gracey, and member of the Yale family.

At the age of 20 Bleecker joined the United States Navy as a midshipman, serving for the next five years. He then worked in the publishing and book business. From 1833 to 1844, he served as principal to different private female seminaries and taught over 1,400 pupils from across the country. He then worked in the New York Custom House, first as an examiner in the Appraiser's Department then as an inspector in the Collector's Department.

In 1856, Bleecker was elected supervisor of the Brooklyn Seventh Ward. In 1857, he was elected to the New York State Assembly as a Democrat, representing the Kings County 7th District. He served in the Assembly in 1858.

In 1821, Bleecker married Phebe S. Jordan. She died in 1826. He then married Ann Eliza Watson. He was a Baptist, and served as secretary of the New York Sunday School Teachers' Association. He also served as a manager of the Saint Nicholas Society of the City of New York.

Bleecker died in Brooklyn on November 23, 1859. He was buried in Green-Wood Cemetery.

References

External links 

 The Political Graveyard
 George W. Bleecker at Find a Grave

1800 births
1859 deaths
Politicians from Brooklyn
American school principals
Schoolteachers from New York (state)
County legislators in New York (state)
Democratic Party members of the New York State Assembly
19th-century American politicians
Baptists from New York (state)
Burials at Green-Wood Cemetery
United States Navy sailors
19th-century American educators
19th-century Baptists
Bleecker family